Castle Storm is the second novel in the Welkin Weasels series by Garry Kilworth. Picking up shortly after the end of Thunder Oak, the novel centres on the anthropomorphised weasels searching for the humans that mysteriously vanished from their homeland many years before. Following a clue found in the first book, the weasels, led by the outlaw Sylver and pursued by the stoat Sheriff Falshed, journey to a far-away city where they find themselves entangled in a battle between rivalling clans of squirrels. Published in Germany under the title "Belagert die Sturmburg."

Synopsis
After discovering the second clue to the whereabouts of the humans lies at the famed Castle Storm, the outlaw weasels journey to the south of Welkin, where the castle lies, to discover more about the mysterious human evacuation. However, a cascade of rats is swarming down from the marshes in the north of the island to seize power from Prince Poynt.

Plot

In the unnamed marshes in the north of Welkin, the evil stoat lord Flaggatis plots to eradicate Prince Poynt's grip on power. He sends his evil rats to commence a massive war against the stoats. His main attack source is Castle Rayn, home of the stoats, but he also has other targets, too: County Elleswhere, home of Sylver's band, and County Fearsomeshire, home of Lord Ragnar. Prince Poynt and his stoats are overwhelmed, 'in their beds', as Flaggatis hopes, but not before a ferret messenger is sent to Lord Haukin, ruler of Halfmoon Wood.

In the wood, Sylver's band corner the ferret and eventually, when Sylver arrives, they listen to his story. Lord Flaggatis has built a massive wooden god-effigy, more like a monstrous white rat than anything else. After hearing the ferret's alarming tale, the weasels consider what to do and decide to support the stoats in their battle against the rats, as the rats are the enemies of all of Welkin and the weasels start to travel to Castle Rayn. They eventually reach it, although they have to contend with several cowardly stoat mercenaries upon the way, who have deserted the war out of fear of the rats, but eventually the cowardly stoat soldiers join the weasels to attack the rats. The weasels send Scirf and Mawk in to infiltrate the castle, and they eventually enter, but the weasels are captured by Prince Poynt in the process, who throws them in his dungeons. Mawk the doubter convinces their guard to play a game of hollyhockers with him, and appears to lose, but later he reveals that he held the guard's key to the weasels' cell in his mouth all along.

After slipping through a grating cover, the weasels worm their way down through the underground rivers and enter an otter colony, where they meet Sleek, an otter obsessed with fashion. Back at Castle Rayn, Prince Poynt appears cleverer than he looks, and tells Sheriff Falshed to follow the weasels and obstruct them in their quest. After allowing him to free them, the weasels then enter an open lake where they meet their old friend Sheriff Falshed, who has been knocked unconscious by the fall from the cliff. After contending with some rats and a giant dragonfly nymph, carnivorous in nature (carnivorous meaning mammal-eating, rather than insect eating) Sheriff Falshed fakes amnesia, and thus the weasels finally make their way to the castle, leaving Sleek the otter to go his own way (to find a fashion industry). Sheriff Falshed fakes amnesia throughout the entire voyage to Castle Storm, where the weasels meet a massive rivalry between the grey squirrels and the highly arrogant red squirrels. The red squirrels are led by Clive of Coldkettle, who sports an extra-large tail, and the grey squirrels are led by Pommf de Fritte. The weasels are accepted by the reds, and are shown around town by Clive, where Sylver encounters a coven of moles, who, much to Sylver's alarm, proclaim him to be Lord of Elleswhere.

The weasels are invited to a tournament, where, to their horror, their friend Icham is killed by Torca Marda. Icham dies despite an attempt to revive him by a good stoat doctor. After a feast that night, where the weasels meet two evil ferrets called Rosencrass and Guildenswine, who plot to kill Prince Poynt, and an extremely evil stoat called Torca Marda, who killed Sylver's father. The weasels then journey down beneath the castle to search for the clue, and narrowly avoid death when Torca Marda attempts to kill the weasels by resurrecting a badger, although they kill the fiend by stabbing it with a raptor's claw. Then the dragonfly from the lake breaks out of its aquatic nature and attacks the castle, devouring any creature in its path. The coven of moles, still intent on Sylver being a lord, suggest that they should feed the old and weak animals to the ravenous beast, and Torca Marda agrees on this mad plan.

Wodehed the magician comes up with a solution to the problem of the dragonfly: they must journey to the Forest of Lost Birds and retrieve a secret herb, known as Shatter from the goddess Sessile's garden. Sessile is a sentient tree, and in her roots another dimension resides. On their way to the forest, they run into, and escape, a group of birds who are obsessed with the idea of returning home to their island via a ship of Braeburns, and then are attacked by Rosencrass and Guildenswine, who, upon revealing that they have murdered one of the birds, are imprisoned in the trees of the Forest of Lost Birds. The weasels retrieve the herb, return to Castle Storm, and destroy the dragonfly, whereupon it shatters into small, harmless dragonflies. Torca Marda, furious at this loss of chaos, attempts to kill Sylver, but is scared off by Scirf, pretending to be an animal dying from the mange, and falls over a cliff to his death. His priests, attempting to shatter the squirrels into pieces with the herb, are themselves turned into minuscule stoats by the same herb and Welkin is free of the evil of Torca Marda. The next day Lord Ragnar is killed in battle with the rats, and Prince Poynt promises to elect Sylver to a lord if he defeats the rats, thus fulfilling the mole coven's prophecy. Lord Haukin tells Sylver and the weasels to partially knock down the sea walls, allowing a bore to flood to Castle Rayn and destroy the rat hordes, along with the effigy, although Lord Flaggatis escapes, along with most of the rats.

The otter Sleek comes to Castle Rayn to make a fashion industry with the stoat princess, Prince Poynt's sister, (who secretly fancies Falshed) and the prince is left to his misery, thinking gloomily about his murdered brother, King Redfur (Poynt refuses to be king as all the previous stoat kings were murdered) who often enters his mind when he is feeling depressed. The novel ends with Poynt overlooking a massive inland salt lake which now spreads around his castle, whereas in the rest of Welkin the sea begins to cascade down into the land.

Major characters

Weasels
Sylver – leader of the outlaws
Bryony – a straightforward jill
Alysoun – a knowledgeable jill
Miniver – a sensitive, small jill
Mawk – a cowardly but good-natured jack
Scirf – a confident, dirty and honest jack
Wodehed – the group's inept mage
Icham – Sylver's best friend 
Luke – a holy weasel

Stoats
Lord Haukin – A well-read and gentle-tempered old stoat who rules County Elleswhere.
Prince Poynt –
Sheriff Falshed – The High Sheriff of Welkin
Princess Sibiline –
Lord Flagattis –
Torca Marda – The sadistic Grand Inquisitor.
Cardinal Orgoglio –
Monsignor Furioso –

Other Animals
Clive of Coldkettle – The boisterous, one-eyed leader of the red squirrels, famed for his lengthy tail which curves inward.
Pommf de Fritte – The leader of the grey squirrels.
Rosencrass and Guildenswine – A pair of sneaky ferrets who sell information to the highest bidder. Rosencrass is male, and Guildenswine is female.

Minor characters

Weasels
Culver – Lord Haukin's faithful and patient servant, who is penning the history of Welkin.
Gritnal – Lord Ragnar's servant; at odds with Culver.
Pompom – Prince Poynt's impetuous court jester; never without an inflated mouse bladder on a stick, with which he hits other creatures.

Stoats
Grubelgut – A stoat specialising in the creation of poisons, who Torca Marda intends to have assassinate Prince Poynt.
King Redfur – Prince Poynt's brother and the former ruler of Welkin. Prince Poynt had him assassinated by the fox Magellan, after which he took power. The then-priest Torca Marda created a religion worshiping Redfur, and Poynt banished Torca Marda and forbade anyone to mention Redfur's name thereafter. Nonetheless, the Prince is sometimes seen talking to his brother's grave.
Lord Jessex, Lord Elphet, and Lord Wilisen – Noblemen of Welkin who frequently visit Poynt.
Lord Ragnar – The crude and violent Thane of County Fearsomeshire. He is killed by the rats after ignoring Lord Haukin's warnings.
Spinfer – Falshed's creative and quick-thinking servant, who advises Prince Poynt in Falshed's absence.

Red Squirrels
Blodwin –
Eric Rood –
Goodsquirrel –
Imogen –
Link the Stink –
Will Splayfoot –
Wivenhoe –

Grey Squirrels
Derrière –
Foppington –
Kloog – An old alchemist who tells Sylver, Mawk, and Scirf how to defeat the undead badger.
La Belle Savage –
Poisson d'Avril –

Other Creatures
Bead – The head scribe of the monks who live beneath Castle Storm.
Colin – Leader of the ptarmigan clan in the Forest of Lost Birds.
Griselda – The elderly leader of the local psychic mole coven, who foretells that Sylver will be Lord of County Elleswhere.
Mathop, Osmand, Spavin, and Gowk – Members of Griselda's coven.
Mohic – A historical figure that both tribes of squirrels regard as the first squirrel ever born. Mohic gave birth to both the first red and grey squirrels. Her drey is viewed as a holy relic to the squirrels, and they are in constant dispute over which tribe it belongs to.
Sir Percy – A living statue of a knight, which tells Sylver how to find Castle Storm before sinking into a bog.
Sleek – A cheerful young otter obsessed with fashion. After helping the weasels escape his kin, he sets out to Castle Rayn, where he becomes Princess Sibiline's royal fashion adviser.
Robbie – A male red grouse in the Forest of Lost Birds
Wwwillliammms – A male polecat scribe.
Sessile – A gigantic old Oak tree growing in the Forest of Lost Birds; inside her is an eternal garden of every plant and mythical creature ever known.
The Green Man – A being that lives inside Sessile and tends to the eternal garden.

Puns, references, and literary allusions
 The name Torca Marda is derived from that of Tomás de Torquemada, underscoring his brutal interrogation methods.
 The names Rosencrass and Guildenswine are plays on those of Rosencrantz and Guildenstern from Shakespeare's Hamlet.
 Falshed's ramblings when he fakes insanity may have been inspired by the dialogue of Edgar in the guise of Tom o' Bedlam in Shakespeare's King Lear. They also contain many references to other works:
 "Ho! See, a candle flame in yon window niche burns brightly, sire. It must be that Lady M walks at this midnight hour!" – Shakespeare's Macbeth.
 "Young Lochinvar has stolen my bride" – Sir Walter Scott's Marmion.
 "What, sir, will you not listen to an elderly mariner?" – Coleridge's The Rime of the Ancient Mariner.
 "Here's bladderwort – that's for remembrance ..." – Shakespeare's Hamlet.
 "The moving coffee pot pours, and having poured moves on ..." – Rubaiyat of Omar Khayyam.
 Darkmoor may be a reference to the real place Dartmoor.
 The name Sessile comes from the common name for Quercus petraea, the Sessile Oak.
 The name Pommf de Fritte comes from "pommes frites", the French name for French fries.
 The name Poisson d'Avril comes from a French April Fools' Day tradition.
 The name Derrière comes from the French word meaning 'bottom,' a point for which the character is the butt of many jokes.
 The name Furioso comes from the Italian epic Orlando Furioso.
 The name Orgoglio comes from that of a character in Edmund Spenser's epic The Faerie Queene, which was heavily inspired by Orlando Furioso.
 The mole coven and their addressing of Sylver as "Thane of County Elleswhere" are allusions to the witches of Shakespeare's Macbeth.
 Poynt's complaint "Who will rid me of this meddlesome priest?" before his banishment of Torca Marda is a reference to the story of Thomas Becket.
 "Patent number 101", the torture device Torca Marda uses on Falshed, is a reference to the book Nineteen Eighty-Fours "Room 101". In Nineteen Eighty-Four, the character Winston is tortured with the threat of having a wire cage of rats strapped to his face. "Patent number 101" is a wire helmet with two attached cages full of earwigs, which works in a similar way.
 The squirrel Link leading the weasels through the secret passages may be a reference to the game The Legend of Zelda.
 The claw-of-glory' which must be used to kill the ghoul is based on the legendary Hand of Glory.

See also

 Garry Kilworth
 Welkin Weasels
 Thunder Oak

References

External links
 Official website of Garry Kilworth

1998 British novels
1998 fantasy novels
British fantasy novels
Children's novels about animals
Fictional weasels
Fictional squirrels
British children's novels
1998 children's books
Corgi books